Ravindra Vishwanath Gaikwad (born 27 April 1960) is an Indian politician associated with Shiv Sena, and was a  member of the 16th Lok Sabha of India from 2014 to 2019 as a member of that party. He did not contest Lok Sabha elections in 2019. In 2014, he had contested from Osmanabad constituency of Maharashtra, and defeated sitting MP Padamsinha Bajirao Patil who contested from Nationalist Congress Party by 235,325 votes by obtaining 607,699 votes against 373,374.  Before 2014, he was a two time MLA from omerga constituency. He has also been the Chairman of Killari Sugar Factory. He is a director on the agriculture board committee in the Central Government of India. His son Kiran Ravindra Gaikwad lost the Zilla parishad Osmanabad election from kunhali constituency. The loss to  prakash Ashte was widely discussed in media.

Controversies
Ravindra Gaikwad himself has various criminal charges against him which include voluntarily causing hurt to deter public servants from duty, criminal intimidation and rioting among others. 

On 23 March 2017, while travelling to Delhi from Pune, he was accused of hitting an Air India staff with his shoe 25 times and attempting to throw him out of the plane. This act led all of the Indian Airline companies to impose a No-Fly ban on him. He mentioned that he is not a BJP member to tolerate the scolding. Delhi police filed two criminal charges on him: one for hitting the government staff on duty and the other for taking the plane ransom without departing from the plane. He has been designated as the first person to the NoFly list in India. The incident happened when the Air India flight AI852 from Pune reached Delhi around 10.30 a.m. on March 23, 2017. 

Earlier, in 2014 he was in a row over trying to force-feed a Muslim caterer during the fasting month of Ramzan.

In April 2017, Ravindra Gaikwad and his supporters were booked for unlawful assembly, misbehaviour and causing disorder at a public place following an incident in Latur, Maharashtra, where he allegedly behaved rudely with police officials, staged an agitation and shouted slogans. This was in response to his inability to get money from an ATM. He expressed concerns about lack of availability of cash despite significant passage of time after demonetization. He expressed a view that it was the Union Finance Minister as well as the Maharashtra Finance Minister's responsibility to rectify the situation.

Positions held
 1995 - 1999 : Member, State Legislative Assembly, Maharashtra
 2004 - 2009 : Member, State Legislative Assembly, Maharashtra
 2014 : Elected to 16th Lok Sabha
 1 Sep. 2014 onwards : Member, Standing Committee on Agriculture

See also
 List of members of the 16th Lok Sabha
 Umarga (Vidhan Sabha constituency)

References

External links
 Shivsena Home Page
 http://india.gov.in/my-government/indian-parliament/ravindra-vishwanath-gaikwad
 Goon Gaikwad
  रवींद्र गायकवाड दोन लाखांवर मतांनी विजयी

Living people
1960 births
People from Osmanabad district
Shiv Sena politicians
Lok Sabha members from Maharashtra
India MPs 2014–2019
People from Marathwada
Maharashtra MLAs 1995–1999
Maharashtra MLAs 2004–2009
Dr. Babasaheb Ambedkar Marathwada University alumni